Unified Popular Action Front (in Spanish: Frente de Acción Popular Unificada) was a revolutionary mass front in El Salvador, linked to the Fuerzas Armadas de la Resistencia Nacional. FAPU was formed in 1974. It consisted of trade union, student, peasants and teachers organizations.

In 1980 FAPU was one of the founding organizations of Coordinadora Revolucionaria de Masas.

Defunct political parties in El Salvador
Salvadoran Civil War